Chippewa County is the name of several counties in the United States:

 Chippewa County, Michigan 
 Chippewa County, Minnesota 
 Chippewa County, Wisconsin